Green Lane Masjid & Community Centre (GLMCC), is a mosque in Birmingham. It has been a registered charity in England since 2008. The Masjid occupies a prominent corner site in Green Lane, Small Heath, Birmingham.

The complex includes prayer halls for men and women, a community hall, madrasah, library, shop, and some accommodation. It also provides funeral services to the local Muslim community.

History
One of the buildings was originally constructed as a public library and baths, designed by local architects Martin & Chamberlain and built in the redbrick and terracotta Gothic-Jacobean style between 1893 and 1902. It is a Grade II listed building.

Projects and Campaigns 
In Birmingham each year since 2011 there is an Eid al-Fitr celebration in Small Heath Park.  This began as "an outdoor prayer facilitated by Green Lane Masjid and Community Centre."  This was attended by 44,000 people in 2014, 60,000 in 2015, 88,000 in 2016 and 100,000 in 2017 and is organised by Green Lane Masjid and five other local mosques.

In addition, GLMCC runs and participates in various projects aimed at raising funds for charity and providing services for needy causes. Some of these include collaborating with My Foster Family, an organisation which raises awareness of foster care in the Muslim community, to distribute care packages for Ramadan throughout Birmingham "aimed at uniting non-Muslim foster carers with the Muslim children they look after are being handed out during Ramadan."

The Mosque also raises money through donations from congregants, estimated to reach £1million in the month of Ramadan in 2019, which will be used towards providing meals for Syrian refugees as well as for community iftars held by the Mosque for local residents weekly throughout the month.

In 2019, GLMCC made headlines for their announcement of a 'plastic-free Ramadan' in collaboration with ecobirmingham. In efforts to combat the issue of plastic waste, the Mosque installed water fountains throughout its building, opting instead to sell reusable water bottles to congregants rather than distributing free water bottles as it had done in previous years.

Controversy 
It was also one of the mosques featured in Channel 4's 2007 Dispatches programme Undercover Mosque, which investigated religious extremism in British mosques, including preachers advocating violence, anti-Semitism, sexism, and homophobia. West Midlands Police subsequently carried out an investigation into whether criminal offenses had been committed by those preaching or teaching at the mosque. While West Midlands Police believed there was a case to answer and submitted their evidence to the CPS (Crown Prosecution Service), the CPS ruled that "a realistic prosecution was unlikely." The police subsequently investigated the programme itself and submitted a report to Ofcom on the basis of "unfair editing" designed to misrepresent the subjects of the programme. Ofcom ruled that there was no case to answer and that it was a "legitimate investigation." Both Channel 4 and the programme makers sued the CPS for libel, and settled for a payment of £100,000.

In a 2007 national competition to find the country's 'Model Mosque' run by the British Islam Channel, the mosque came second, behind the Madni Jamia Masjid.

See also
 Islam in the United Kingdom
 Islamic schools and branches
 List of mosques in the United Kingdom

References

External links
Green Lane Masjid
Markazi Jamiat Ahl-e-Hadith UK

Mosques in Birmingham, West Midlands
Mosque-related controversies in Europe
Grade II listed buildings in the West Midlands (county)
Small Heath, Birmingham